Bartkiewicz is a Polish surname. Notable people with this surname include:

 Andrzej Bartkiewicz (born 1991), Polish cyclist
 Drew Bartkiewicz, American business executive

See also
 

Polish-language surnames